Shiv Khori, is a famous cave shrines of Hindus devoted to lord Shiva, situated in the Sangar village, Pouni, near Reasi town in the Reasi district of Jammu and Kashmir in India.

Location
In Reasi district, there are many shrines such as Mata Vaishno Devi, Merhada Mata, Baba Dhansar, Siad Baba. Shiv Khori is one of them located in Ransoo a village in the Pouni block in Reasi district, which attracts lakhs of devotees annually. Shiv Khori is situated in between the hillocks about 140 km north of Jammu, 120 km from Udhampur and 80 km from Katra.and light vehicles go up to Ransoo, the base camp of pilgrimage. People have to traverse about 3 km on foot on a track recently constructed by the Shiv Khori Shrine Board, Ransoo duly headed by the Divisional Commissioner Jammu as chairman and District Development Commissioner, Reasi as vice-chairman.

Description

Khori means cave (Guffa) and Shiv Khori thus denotes Shiva's cave. This natural cave is about 200 metres long, one metre wide and two to three metres high and contains a self made lingam, which according to the people is unending. The first entrance of the cave is so wide that 300 devotees can be accommodated at a time. Its cavern is spacious to accommodate large number of people. The inner chamber of the cave is smaller.

The passage from outer to the inner chamber is low and small, at one spot it divides itself into two parts. One of these is believed to have led to Kashmir where Swami Amarnath cave is located. It is now closed as some sadhus who dared to go ahead never returned. To reach the sanctum sanctorum, one has to stoop low, crawl or adjust his body sideward.  Inside a naturally created image of Lord Shiva, about 4 metres high, is visible. The cave abounds with a number of other natural objects having resemblance with Goddess Parvati, Ganesha and Nandigan. The cave roof is etched with snake formations, the water trickles through these on Shiva Lingam. Pigeons are also seen here like Swami Amar Nath cave which presents good omens for pilgrimages.\

Other details

About 40 to 50 years ago, only a few people knew about the Shiv Khori shrine but it has gained much popularity during recent decades. In earlier times the number of yatries was just in thousands but after the constitution of Shiv Khori Shrine Board during December 2003, the number of devotees has superseded previous records as the number of devotees in year 2005 crossed 300,000. This year {2016} it is expected to exceed 20,00,000 tourists. Some 30 percent of devotees reach the shrine from within the state and 70 percent from different states of the country.

A 3-day Shiv Khori mela takes place annually on Maha Shivratri and thousands of pilgrims from different parts of the state and outside visit this cave shrine to seek blessings of Lord Shiva. Maha Shivratri festival is usually held in the month of February or during the first week of March every year.
Keeping in view the increasing rush of pilgrims to the holy cave shrine, the Shiv Khori Shrine Board has taken up a number of steps to develop this spot in a bid to provide more and more facilities to the devotees, like the construction of Shrine Guest House at a cost of Rs. 1.9 million at village Ransoo, the base camp of yatra, Reception Centre and Pony shed at an estimated cost of Rs. 8 million, tile work of entire 3-km long track is nearing completion, plantation of ornamental and medicinal plants on track and development of parks etc.
Other arrangements like electrification of the cave with modern techniques, provision of oxygen and electric generators, exhaust fans, construction of shelter sheds for yatris with toilet facilities near the cave site, 15 shelter sheds en route Ransoo to cave shrine, railing from the base camp to cave, additional facility of 15,000/EfnrKing water reservoir, proper sanitation, provision of 25 kV capacity electric transformer, cloak room, starting of permanent bus services from Katra, Udhampur and Jammu, Police post and Dispensary and a STD PCO are under active consideration of the Shiv Khori Shrine Development Board.

To meet the ever-growing rush of devotees in having smooth darshans of Lord Shiva, an exit tunnel has been constructed by the Shri Shivkhori Shrine Board this year in February.

Post lockdown, time has been restricted from 7 AM to 5 PM. Arti time is 7 AM to 8 AM and 7 PM to 8 PM. Advance Darshan booking is required.

Post Lock-down Temple Timing and Procedure:

Starting August 20, Pilgrim has to do advance online booking for the Darshan. Darshan can be booked using following URL,

https://darshan.yatradham.org/bookings/ShriShivKhoriShrineBoard/PnPIBrLI/create

There are few restrictions like total no. of visitors is limited to 1000 (500 from JK and 500 from other states). Darshan time is limited from 7 AM to 5 PM.

Other Terms & Conditions -

1.  COVID negative certificate not later than 72 hours from the date of Darshan.

2.  The total permissible daily limit is of 1000 devotees per day (500 from J&K 500 from other states).

3.  Mask and Social Distancing are compulsory all the time.

4.  Below 10 Years and Above 65 Years people are not allowed into the temple.

5.  Darshan Booking voucher is not interstate/government Permission.

6.  The pilgrims should not carry any luggage/cell phones/electronic gadgets while reporting.

7.  All the Pilgrims in group tickets have to report together.

8.  The pilgrims shall wear Traditional Dress only.

              Male: Dhoti, Shirt / Kurta, Pyjama.

              Female: Saree / Half Saree / Churidar with Dupatta.

9.  Pilgrims who booked for Darshan should bring the printed copy of their receipt.

10. Reporting and late reporting of Darshan will not be allowed.

11. All bookings are FINAL: Postponement/advancement/cancellation is not allowed.

12. Shri Shiv Khori Shrine Board reserves the right of changing the terms and conditions or cancellation of Darshan under Special Circumstances.

Important places near Shivkhori 
Jammu
Katra
Vaishnodevi
Agharjitto
NavDevi
Baba Dhansar
Reasi
Bhimgarh Fort
kalika Temple
Siar Baba

External links
Official Website of Shri Shivkhori Shrine Board www.shivkhori.in

Advance Darshan Booking

● History of Shiv Khori

Hindu temples in Jammu and Kashmir
Hindu pilgrimage sites in India
Shiva temples in Jammu and Kashmir
Reasi district